Carlos Iván Oyarzun Guíñez (born 26 October 1981) is a Chilean professional road cyclist, who currently rides for UCI Continental team . Oyarzun has also rode for UCI ProTeam .

Doping
On 20 July 2015 the Chilean Olympic Committee announced that Oyarzun had been sent home from the 2015 Pan American Games in Toronto after he had tested positive for the HIF prolyl-hydroxylase inhibitor FG-4592 in a pre-competition test. Oyarzun was at the Games to ride the time trial, but was sent home prior to the event.

Major results

2008
 1st  Overall Tour of Belize
1st Stage 1
2009
 7th Overall Circuito Montañés
2010
 Pan American Road Championships
1st  Road race
2nd  Time trial
 2nd Overall Circuito Montañés
1st Stage 1
2011
 3rd  Time trial, Pan American Games
2012
 National Road Championships
1st  Road race
1st  Time trial
 6th Chrono des Nations
2013
 Pan American Road Championships
1st  Time trial
10th Road race
 5th Overall Volta ao Alentejo
 6th Chrono des Nations
2014
 2nd  Time trial, South American Games
 Pan American Road Championships
3rd  Time trial
7th Road race
 4th Chrono des Nations
2015
 1st  Time trial, Pan American Road Championships
 1st  Overall Vuelta del Uruguay
1st Stage 9 (ITT)
 6th Overall Troféu Joaquim Agostinho
 7th Overall Volta Ciclística Internacional do Rio Grande do Sul
1st Stage 2
2020
 7th Overall La Tropicale Amissa Bongo

See also
List of doping cases in cycling

References

External links

Carlos Oyarzun profile at 
Extended profile

1981 births
Living people
Chilean male cyclists
Cyclists at the 2011 Pan American Games
Sportspeople from Santiago
Doping cases in cycling
Chilean sportspeople in doping cases
Pan American Games bronze medalists for Chile
Pan American Games medalists in cycling
South American Games silver medalists for Chile
South American Games medalists in cycling
Competitors at the 2014 South American Games
Medalists at the 2011 Pan American Games
20th-century Chilean people
21st-century Chilean people